A maxi yacht usually refers to a racing yacht of at least  in length.

Origin
The term maxi originated with the International Offshore Rule (IOR) rating system, which in the 1970s and 1980s measured offshore racing yachts and applied a single-number rating to each boat. This number was approximately equal to the sailing waterline length in feet, plus or minus speed enhancing or reducing factors in the design.

Competition
In the 1980s they were the most glamorous, exciting, expensive and high-visibility racing yachts in the world, with regular appearances at most of the great races such as the Fastnet, Sydney-Hobart, Bermuda Race, and their own private series of regattas in the Mediterranean and Caribbean seas. The maxis were also prominent as line honour contestants in the Whitbread Round the World Race from 1973 to 1993.

Modern maxis
Modern maxi yachts are usually custom-designed and built to the IRC rule but regardless of handicap in order to achieve line honour victories. In 2001 however two  Reichel/Pugh boats were built to the "maxZ86" class in order to match boat speed evenly, but the class did not generate further interest.
In order to achieve higher speeds, maxi yachts were early adopters of modern materials and technologies such as carbon fibre, thermoformed sails, rotating wingmasts, water ballasts and canting keels. Previous smaller maxi yachts are still raced with corrected time class victories in mind whilst the  "mini-maxi" yachts now have a class of their own. Maxi yachts are raced in both inshore and offshore races.

List of largest maxi yachts

• LH designates the length of hull as measured by IRC, excluding bowsprits

See also

International Maxi Association
Maxi Yachts AB - production sailing yachts designed by Olympic medallist Pelle Pettersson and built on the island of Gotland. Over 16,000 have been built over the last 30 years. Current production consists of the Maxi 1200, Maxi 1300 and the Swedish Match 40.

References

Sailboat types